Canora is a former provincial electoral district for the Legislative Assembly of the province of Saskatchewan, Canada, centered on the town of Canora. This constituency was created before the 2nd Saskatchewan general election in 1908. Dissolved in 1934, the district was reconstituted before the 9th Saskatchewan general election in 1938.

It is now part of the constituency of Canora-Pelly.

Members of the Legislative Assembly

1908 – 1934

1938 – 1995

Election results

|-

 
|Provincial Rights
|William Johnston
|align="right"|206
|align="right"|30.98%
|align="right"|–
|- bgcolor="white"
!align="left" colspan=3|Total
!align="right"|665
!align="right"|100.00%
!align="right"|

|-

 
|Conservative
|William McGregor
|align="right"|368
|align="right"|31.92%
|align="right"|+0.94

|Independent
|Mike Gabora
|align="right"|102
|align="right"|8.84%
|align="right"|–
|- bgcolor="white"
!align="left" colspan=3|Total
!align="right"|1,153
!align="right"|100.00%
!align="right"|

|-

 
|Conservative
|William James Fennell
|align="right"|499
|align="right"|17.67%
|align="right"|-14.25

|Independent
|Richard Mitchell
|align="right"|64
|align="right"|2.27%
|align="right"|-6.57
|- bgcolor="white"
!align="left" colspan=3|Total
!align="right"|2,824
!align="right"|100.00%
!align="right"|

|-

|Independent
|Bohdan Michael Sawiak
|align="right"|670
|align="right"|18.27%
|align="right"|+16.00
|- bgcolor="white"
!align="left" colspan=3|Total
!align="right"|3,667
!align="right"|100.00%
!align="right"|

|-

|- bgcolor="white"
!align="left" colspan=3|Total
!align="right"|3,189
!align="right"|100.00%
!align="right"|

|-

|- bgcolor="white"
!align="left" colspan=3|Total
!align="right"|4,203
!align="right"|100.00%
!align="right"|

|-

|style="width: 130px"|CCF
|Myron Henry Feeley
|align="right"|3,504
|align="right"|51.81%
|align="right"|–

|- bgcolor="white"
!align="left" colspan=3|Total
!align="right"|6,763
!align="right"|100.00%
!align="right"|

|-

|style="width: 130px"|CCF
|Myron Henry Feeley
|align="right"|3,538
|align="right"|58.24%
|align="right"|+6.43

|- bgcolor="white"
!align="left" colspan=3|Total
!align="right"|6,075
!align="right"|100.00%
!align="right"|

|-

|style="width: 130px"|CCF
|Alex G. Kuziak
|align="right"|3,104
|align="right"|42.18%
|align="right"|-16.06

|- bgcolor="white"
!align="left" colspan=3|Total
!align="right"|7,358
!align="right"|100.00%
!align="right"|

|-

|style="width: 130px"|CCF
|Alex G. Kuziak
|align="right"|4,141
|align="right"|53.57%
|align="right"|+11.39

|- bgcolor="white"
!align="left" colspan=3|Total
!align="right"|7,730
!align="right"|100.00%
!align="right"|

|-

|style="width: 130px"|CCF
|Alex G. Kuziak
|align="right"|3,713
|align="right"|47.93%
|align="right"|-5.64

|- bgcolor="white"
!align="left" colspan=3|Total
!align="right"|7,747
!align="right"|100.00%
!align="right"|

|-

|style="width: 130px"|CCF
|Alex G. Kuziak
|align="right"|2,919
|align="right"|40.66%
|align="right"|-7.27

|Prog. Conservative
|Lawrence N. Gray
|align="right"|1,816
|align="right"|25.29%
|align="right"|-

|- bgcolor="white"
!align="left" colspan=3|Total
!align="right"|7,179
!align="right"|100.00%
!align="right"|

|-

|CCF
|Alex G. Kuziak
|align="right"|3,348
|align="right"|49.68%
|align="right"|+9.02
|- bgcolor="white"
!align="left" colspan=3|Total
!align="right"|6,739
!align="right"|100.00%
!align="right"|

|-

|style="width: 130px"|NDP
|Al Matsalla
|align="right"|3,386
|align="right"|51.65%
|align="right"|+1.97

|- bgcolor="white"
!align="left" colspan=3|Total
!align="right"|6,556
!align="right"|100.00%
!align="right"|

|-

|style="width: 130px"|NDP
|Al Matsalla
|align="right"|4,135
|align="right"|60.02%
|align="right"|+8.37

|- bgcolor="white"
!align="left" colspan=3|Total
!align="right"|6,889
!align="right"|100.00%
!align="right"|

|-

|style="width: 130px"|NDP
|Al Matsalla
|align="right"|4,024
|align="right"|50.36%
|align="right"|-9.66

|Prog. Conservative
|Michael Kaminski
|align="right"|1,656
|align="right"|20.73%
|align="right"|-
|- bgcolor="white"
!align="left" colspan=3|Total
!align="right"|7,990
!align="right"|100.00%
!align="right"|

|-

|style="width: 130px"|NDP
|Al Matsalla
|align="right"|4,258
|align="right"|55.77%
|align="right"|+5.41

|Prog. Conservative
|Eugene Teslia
|align="right"|2,647
|align="right"|34.67%
|align="right"|+13.94

|- bgcolor="white"
!align="left" colspan=3|Total
!align="right"|7,635
!align="right"|100.00%
!align="right"|

|-

|style="width: 130px"|Progressive Conservative
|Lloyd Hampton
|align="right"|4,398
|align="right"|53.44%
|align="right"|+18.77

|NDP
|Gerard Pikula
|align="right"|3,520
|align="right"|42.77%
|align="right"|-13.00

|- bgcolor="white"
!align="left" colspan=3|Total
!align="right"|8,230
!align="right"|100.00%
!align="right"|

|-

|style="width: 130px"|Progressive Conservative
|Lorne Kopelchuk
|align="right"|4,273
|align="right"|54.65%
|align="right"|+1.21

|NDP
|Linda Kezima
|align="right"|3,271
|align="right"|41.83%
|align="right"|-0.94

|- bgcolor="white"
!align="left" colspan=3|Total
!align="right"|7,819
!align="right"|100.00%
!align="right"|

|-

|style="width: 130px"|NDP
|Darrel Cunningham
|align="right"|3,564
|align="right"|49.91%
|align="right"|+8.08

|Prog. Conservative
|Lorne Kopelchuk
|align="right"|2,746
|align="right"|38.45%
|align="right"|-16.20

|- bgcolor="white"
!align="left" colspan=3|Total
!align="right"|7,141
!align="right"|100.00%
!align="right"|

See also 
Electoral district (Canada)
List of Saskatchewan provincial electoral districts
List of Saskatchewan general elections
List of political parties in Saskatchewan
Canora, Saskatchewan

References 
Saskatchewan Archives Board – Saskatchewan Election Results By Electoral Division

Former provincial electoral districts of Saskatchewan
Canora, Saskatchewan